Mark Jay Singer (born October 19, 1950) is an American journalist and a staff writer at The New Yorker.

Early life 

Singer was born in Tulsa, Oklahoma, in 1950 to Marjorie and Alex Singer. He attended Yale University, where his professors included 
William Zinsser, and graduated with a B.A. in 1972.

Career 

Singer joined the staff of The New Yorker in 1974. Several of his articles for the magazine were expanded into books, including Funny Money, his account of the collapse of the Penn Square Bank of Oklahoma City; and Citizen K: The Deeply Weird American Journey of Brett Kimberlin. Both Funny Money and Citizen K were praised by The New York Times, with reviewer Ben Yagoda comparing Singer to Joseph Mitchell.

Singer's profile of Ricky Jay, an illusionist and scholar, was published in 1993. The article was included in the 2000 anthology Life Stories: Profiles from The New Yorker, edited by David Remnick, and continues to be widely praised, with Manohla Dargis at The New York Times calling it "an excellent profile," and Amazon describing it as, "a prime example of what The New Yorker does best." Singer is credited with arranging a meeting between Jay and filmmakers Molly Bernstein and Alan Edelstein, whose documentary about Jay, Deceptive Practice: The Mysteries and Mentors of Ricky Jay, was released in 2012.

In 1996, Singer was assigned to write a profile of Donald Trump. The article, "Trump Solo," was deeply unflattering to Trump — portraying him as vain, boastful, and highly unreliable as a debtor — and began to recirculate in 2015, with the start of Trump's candidacy in the 2016 presidential election. Writing in The Guardian, columnist Oliver Burkeman called it "a characteristically excellent profile."

In 2005, "Trump Solo" was republished in Character Studies, an anthology of Singer's work. The book was received favorably by The New York Times Book Review, with reviewer Jeff MacGregor calling Singer "a terrific reporter, with a receptive ear for dialogue and a painter's eye for the salient detail." In response to the review in the Times, Trump wrote a letter to the editor, in which he called Singer a "loser" who "was not born with great writing ability." After reading the letter to the editor, Singer sent Trump a thank you note, ironically noting the added publicity Trump had drawn to Character Studies, and enclosing a check for $37.82 as a token of his "enormous gratitude," adding, "You're special to me." Trump sent the letter back, with the handwritten message, ”MARK—YOU ARE A TOTAL LOSER—AND YOUR BOOK (AND WRITINGS) SUCKS! BEST WISHES DONALD P.S. AND I HEAR IT IS SELLING BADLY.”

In 2016, Singer expanded “Trump Solo” into a book, titled Trump and Me, which included present-day reflections on Trump's presidential campaign. It was reviewed favorably by the Daily Telegraph, with reviewer Stephen Robinson writing that the book "offers clearer insight into the mind of the presumptive Republican nominee than any of the detailed biographies written over the years." In the Guardian, Hari Kunzru called it, "a viciously entertaining demolition of the branding savant with the peach pompadour."

In July 2017, Singer wrote a web column about efforts by the 115th United States Congress to repeal the Patient Protection and Affordable Care Act, including thoughts on his own history of treatment for autoimmune disease. The column, written in anticipation of a crucial vote on the repeal by Senator John McCain, was believed by many to have had a decisive effect on McCain's decision-making, with opinion writer Larry O'Connell calling it "tailor-made" for the senator.

Bibliography

Books

Essays and reporting

References

External links 
Appearance on Charlie Rose, January 5, 2004
Appearance on The Takeaway, February 22, 2016

Writers from Tulsa, Oklahoma
1950 births
The New Yorker staff writers
Living people